Clear Lake is a lake in South Dakota, in the United States.

Clear Lake was descriptively named for its clear water.

See also
List of lakes in South Dakota

References

Lakes of South Dakota
Lakes of Hamlin County, South Dakota